A by-election for the Victorian Legislative Assembly district of Niddrie was held on 24 March 2012. The by-election was triggered by the resignation on 27 January 2012 of Rob Hulls, the former Deputy Premier of Victoria, who had held the seat since 1996. The Labor Party retained the seat.

Key dates
The by-election was held on 24 March, the same day as the 2012 Queensland state election.
23 February: Issue of writ
24 February: Nominations opened
1 March: Close of electoral roll
7 March: Close of nominations for party candidates
8 March: Close of nominations for independent candidates
9 March: Early voting commenced
22 March: Close of postal voting
23 March: Early voting closes
24 March: Polling day

Candidates
Candidates who nominated for the by-election are (in ballot paper order):

The Liberal Party who contested the seat at the previous election and gained 34.8 percent of the primary and 43.1 percent of the two-party vote did not run a candidate.

The unregistered Australian Democrats nominated Rob Livesay as a candidate, however the party failed to correctly lodge the nomination form, with one of Livesay's supporting signatories not listed on the electoral roll in the district.

Results

References

External links
2012 Niddrie by-election, Antony Green, (ABC)
2012 Niddrie by-election plan (VEC)

2012 elections in Australia
Victorian state by-elections
2010s in Victoria (Australia)